SiFive is a fabless semiconductor company and provider of commercial RISC-V processor IP and silicon chips based on the RISC-V instruction set architecture (ISA). SiFive's products include cores, SoCs, IPs, and development boards.

SiFive is the first company to produce a chip that implements the RISC-V ISA.

History 
SiFive was founded in 2015 by Krste Asanović, Yunsup Lee, and Andrew Waterman, three researchers from the University of California Berkeley. On November 29, 2016, SiFive released the Freedom Everywhere 310 SoC and the HiFive development board, making SiFive the first company to produce a chip that implements the RISC-V ISA, although universities have produced earlier RISC-V processors.

In August 2017, SiFive hired Naveed Sherwani as CEO. In October, SiFive did a limited release of its U54-MC, reportedly the world's first RISC-V based 64-bit quad-core CPU to support fully featured operating systems like Linux.

In June 2018, SiFive acquired Open-Silicon for an undisclosed amount and retained their design capabilities for specialized chips, also called application-specific integrated circuits, or ASICs.

In February 2018, SiFive released the HiFive Unleashed, a development board containing a 64-bit SoC with four U54 cores.

In September 2020, the company announced Patrick Little as the new CEO.

In October 2020, SiFive released the HiFive Unmatched, a Mini-ITX development board with four U74-MC cores, one S7 core, 8GB DDR4 RAM, four USB 3.2 Gen1 ports, one PCI Express x16 slot, one PCIe Gen3 x4, one microSD card slot, and a Gigabit Ethernet. In April 2021, the company also taped out its first system-on-chip on TSMC's N5 process technology, making it the first RISC-V-based device to be made using a 5 nm node.

In June 2021, Canonical announced its Ubuntu operating system supports the HiFive Unmatched and HiFive Unleashed, and the Barcelona Supercomputing Center collaborated with Codeplay Software and SiFive to implement support for the RISC-V V-extension v0.10 in the LLVM compilation infrastructure, providing vector computation capabilities through C/C++ intrinsics.

Growth 
In April 2018, SiFive received $50.6 million Series C funding, including a major amount from Intel Capital.

In June 2019, SiFive received $65.4 million in a Series D funding round led by existing investors Sutter Hill Ventures, Chengwei Capital, Spark Capital, Osage University Partners and Huami, alongside new investor Qualcomm Ventures. This brought the total investment in SiFive to $125 million.

On October 23, 2019, at the Linley Fall Processor Conference, SiFive announced the release of SiFive Shield, a platform security architecture. In December 2019, the company announced the SiFive Apex cores for mission-critical markets and SiFive Intelligence cores for vector processing workloads. Later that month, Samsung also announced it will be using SiFive RISC-V cores for SoCs, automotive, and 5G applications.

In January 2020, SiFive hired Chris Lattner, an American software engineer best known as the main author of LLVM and related projects such as the Clang compiler and the Swift programming language. He joined SiFive as Senior Vice President of Platform Engineering after two years at Google.

In August 2020, SiFive received $60 million in a Series E funding round led by investors SK Hynix and Saudi Aramco. This brought the total investment in SiFive to $186 million. That same month, SiFive announced the creation of the OpenFive business unit to focus on the creation of processor-agnostic custom SoC design.

Chip company Tenstorrent, headed by former top AMD engineers, including CTO Jim Keller, licensed SiFive's Intelligence X280 processor cores in October 2020 into its homegrown AI training and inference chips. Renesas Electronics also announced partnering with SiFive to design chips for vehicles.

In June 2021, SiFive launched a new processor family with two core designs: P270, a Linux-capable CPU; and P550, the highest-performing RISC-V CPU. At the same time, Intel's Foundry Service adopted P550 for use in its Horse Creek platform, a RISC-V development platform built on Intel's newest 7 nm process node, Intel 4. The announcement furthered speculation of a potential acquisition of SiFive by Intel, which reportedly offered to acquire SiFive for $2 billion.

As part of SiFive's “relentless innovation” program, the company announced SiFive 21G2 update for the SiFive Essential family including 11% faster U74 cores.

In March 2022, SiFive received $175 million in a Series F funding round led by Coatue Management, valuing the company at over $2.5 billion. This brought the total investment in SiFive to over $350 million.

Products 

 RISC-V Cores: SiFive Core Series – The SiFive Core IP portfolio consists of three distinct families spanning from high-performance application processors to area-optimized, low-power embedded 64- and 32-bit microcontrollers, to vector processors designed with modern compute requirements in mind. All SiFive processors are based upon the RISC-V ISA.
The SiFive Performance processor family are designed for higher throughput for performance while preserving energy-efficient within a small footprint
The SiFive Intelligence family leverages a software-first approach to processor design to address the future requirements of deploying machine learning technology to accelerate AI/ML applications with high performance vector computation capabilities based on the RISC-V Vector extension and SiFive Intelligence extension.
The SiFive Essential family of processor cores spans from high-performance multi-core heterogeneous application processors to area-optimized, low-power embedded microcontrollers. SiFive Essential standard core microarchitectures are based on the RISC-V ISA to provide 64-bit and 32-bit options and can be configured using SiFive Core Designer to create custom configurations. 
 SoC IP – The SoC IP is customizable, or customers choose from Memory Interface IP, Connectivity IP, or System and Peripheral IP.
 Custom SoC – Starting with an SoC template, users can create custom SoC designs to be optimized for power, performance, and area.
 Boards and Software – SiFive also produces the FE310 microcontroller, HiFive1, HiFive Unleashed, and other development boards and software.

DesignShare platform 
DesignShare is an open source platform for building prototypes. SiFive partners with vendors to provide IP to customers designing custom chip prototypes without paying IP fees in advance. Once chip designs are ready for mass production, customers pay for the IP. DesignShare partners include Brite Semiconductor, Rambus, Chipus Microelectronics, and more.

References 

Fabless semiconductor companies
Semiconductor companies of the United States
Open hardware organizations and companies
Open microprocessors
American companies established in 2015
Companies based in San Francisco
2015 establishments in California